Bid or BID may refer to:

Offer
 An attempt or effort to achieve something
 Automated bid managers, advertising tools used to manage budgets on pay per click campaigns
 Bidding, making a price offer in an auction, stock exchange, or card games
 Bid, in a financial market, the price a market maker will buy a commodity at to buy a product in such a way; see bid–ask spread
 Bid manager, an executive sales role within an organization, responsible for managing bids
 Bid price, a price offered for a good by a potential buyer or a price offered by a potential vendor to perform a specific job
 Bid, a formal invitation to join a fraternity or sorority

Places
 Bid, Razavi Khorasan, a village in Razavi Khorasan Province, Iran
 Bid, South Khorasan, a village in South Khorasan Province, Iran
 Beed, a town in Maharashtra, India is sometimes referred to as Bid
 Block Island State Airport, by IATA Code
 Beth Israel Deaconess Medical Center, a hospital in Boston, USA

Science, medicine and technology
 BH3 interacting domain death agonist, a pro-apoptotic protein
 Binary integer decimal
 Brought in dead, a patient found dead upon the arrival of medical assistance
 bis in die, (Latin for "twice daily"), a medication dosage
 Bugtraq ID, a list of security vulnerabilities
 Bridge ID in networking, see Spanning Tree Protocol
 Body integrity dysphoria, mental disorder
 Body image disturbance, common symptom of eating disorders

Other uses
 Bid, lead singer and songwriter of the band The Monochrome Set
 Before I Disappear, a 2014 film
 Shop at Bid, a defunct British shopping channel formerly known as Bid
 Business improvement district
 Sotheby's, by stock ticker symbol
 French, Portuguese and Spanish acronym for the Inter-American Development Bank
 Bachelor of Industrial Design (B.I.D.)